Blackshirts are members of the anti-religious, atheist quasi-political organization Dravidar Kazhagam in Tamil Nadu, founded by "Periyar" E V Ramasamy. Periyar wanted to uproot caste sentiments and superstitions prevalent in Tamil society. So, he  and to fight superstition, he chose the black shirt. The cadres of the Dravidian movement have followed it since. This has its origins in  the banning of black flags as a protest tool in Tamil Nadu. To circumvent this ban, members wore black shirts. Black shirts and black flags were also seen as a symbol of anarchy in southern India especially in Tamil Nadu during the early 20th century.

References

 Revenue officials launch `black-shirt' agitation
 Karunanidhi leads black shirt agitation
 Changing Mores of the Dravidian Movement

Dravidian movement
Clothing in politics